Bahara may refer to:
Bahara, Uttar Pradesh, India
Bahara, Iran
"Bahara" (song), from the 2010 Hindi film I Hate Luv Storys